"Rockin'" Ronald Lee Bellamy (born December 13, 1964) is an American professional boxer.  He is the half-brother of former NBA center Walt Bellamy.  Ron also started his career in basketball, playing collegiately at UNC-Charlotte and professionally in New Zealand and Europe.

At age 35, with his basketball playing days over, Bellamy entered a career as a professional boxer.  In his career, he has amassed a record of 14 wins (9 knockouts), 5 losses, and 4 draws.  Bellamy was the opponent in Joe Mesi's comeback bout on April 1, 2006, and he lost to Mesi by unanimous decision.

References

External links
 

1964 births

Living people
Place of birth missing (living people)
American male boxers